The 2012 Delaware Fightin' Blue Hens football team represented the University of Delaware as a member of the Colonial Athletic Association (CAA) during the 2012 NCAA Division I FCS football season. Led by K. C. Keeler in his 11th and final season as head coach, the Fightin' Blue Hens compiled an overall record of 5–6 with a mark of 2–6 in conference play, placing eighth in the CAA. The team played home games at Delaware Stadium in Newark, Delaware.

Keeler was fired after the season.

Previous season
In 2011, Delaware came into the season ranked No. 5 in both The Sports Network Poll and The Coaches Poll. After losing the season-opener to Navy of the Football Bowl Subdivision (FBS) and beating Division II team West Chester, the Blue Hens went 3−3 against Football Championship Subdivision (FCS) teams over the next six games of the season. They finished the year with three straight conference wins and a final record of 7−4. With only six Division I wins, they were not invited to the FCS playoffs after the regular season. Delaware was ranked No. 17 in The Sports Network Poll and No. 20 in The Coaches Poll.

Schedule

Personnel

Coaching staff
Delaware head coach K. C. Keeler was in his 11th year as the Blue Hens' head coach. During his previous ten years with Delaware, he led the Fightin' Blue Hens to an overall record of 81–46 and a NCAA Division I-AA Football Championship in 2003.

Delaware promoted Andy Marino from his role as a graduate assistant to tight ends and offensive tackles coach on July 26, 2012. Marino took the place of David Boler, who left to become the wide receivers coach for Rhode Island. Kirk Ciarrocca was rehired as running backs coach after being an assistant coach for Rutgers and Richmond for four seasons. He was the offensive coordinator and quarterbacks coach for Delaware from 2002 to 2007.

Transfers
Redshirt sophomore quarterback Trent Hurley transferred from Bowling Green and redshirt freshman guard Sam Collura transferred to Delaware from Pittsburgh. Three former Maryland players transferred to Delaware: junior defensive tackle Zach Kerr, junior linebacker David Mackall, and redshirt sophomore defensive back Mario Rowson. Redshirt sophomore defensive end Andrew Opoku from Connecticut transferred to Delaware. Redshirt junior tight end Malcolm Bush transferred from Rutgers in August.

Opening depth chart

Game summaries

West Chester

Sources:

Delaware State

Sources:

Bucknell

Sources:

William & Mary

Sources:

New Hampshire

Sources:

Maine

Sources:

Rhode Island

Sources:

Old Dominion

Sources:

Towson

Sources:

Richmond

Sources:

Villanova

Sources:

Ranking movements

References

Delaware
Delaware Fightin' Blue Hens football seasons
Delaware Fightin' Blue Hens football